Iselin Maria Moen Solheim (born 7 August 1995) is a Norwegian freestyle wrestler from Notodden. She won one of the bronze medals in the women's 76kg event at the 2019 European Games held in Minsk, Belarus. She also won a bronze medal at the 2020 European Wrestling Championships held in Rome, Italy.

Career 
In 2016, she competed in the second Olympic Qualification Tournament held in Istanbul, Turkey. Her hopes of competing at the 2016 Summer Olympics were dashed when she lost her first match against Maria Selmaier of Germany. She then entered the repechage where she won against Dayanara Rivera of Puerto Rico but failed to secure the bronze medal in her match against Gozal Zutova of Azerbaijan.

In 2017, she competed in the women's freestyle 75kg event at the European Wrestling Championships held in Novi Sad, Serbia where she was eliminated in her first match by Epp Mäe of Estonia. Mäe went on to win one of the bronze medals. In the same year, she also competed in the women's freestyle 75kg event at the 2017 World Wrestling Championships held in Paris, France. She was eliminated in her first match by Andrea Olaya of Colombia. In 2018, she competed at the Klippan Lady Open in Klippan, Sweden without winning a medal. At the 2018 European U23 Wrestling Championship in Istanbul, Turkey, she won one of the bronze medals in the women's 76kg event.

In 2019, she competed in the women's 76kg event at the European Wrestling Championships in Bucharest, Romania where she lost her bronze medal match against Zsanett Németh of Hungary. At the 2020 European Wrestling Championships in Rome, Italy, she won one of the bronze medals in the women's 76kg event. In her bronze medal match she defeated Vasilisa Marzaliuk of Belarus.

In March 2021, she competed at the European Qualification Tournament in Budapest, Hungary hoping to qualify for the 2020 Summer Olympics in Tokyo, Japan. She did not qualify as she lost her match in the quarterfinals against Natalia Vorobieva of Russia. She then also lost her bronze medal match against Martina Kuenz of Austria. In April 2021, she was eliminated in her first match in the 76kg event at the European Wrestling Championships in Warsaw, Poland. In May 2021, she failed to qualify for the Olympics at the World Olympic Qualification Tournament held in Sofia, Bulgaria. She was eliminated in her first match by Zsanett Németh of Hungary. In October 2021, she was eliminated in her first match in the 76kg event at the World Wrestling Championships held in Oslo, Norway.

Achievements

References

External links 

 

Living people
1995 births
People from Notodden
Norwegian female sport wrestlers
Wrestlers at the 2019 European Games
European Games bronze medalists for Norway
European Games medalists in wrestling
European Wrestling Championships medalists
Sportspeople from Vestfold og Telemark
21st-century Norwegian women